The 2009 Grand Slam of Darts ITV Wildcard Qualifier was the qualifying event for the 2009 Grand Slam of Darts which was held at the Magnum Centre in Irvine on 6 November 2009. 21st seed Steve Maish won the event after beating unseeded Arron Monk 5-3 in the final.

Seeds
  Ronnie Baxter
  Dennis Priestley
  Mark Walsh
  Alan Tabern
  Peter Manley
  Mark Dudbridge
  Wayne Jones
  Jelle Klaasen
  Jamie Caven
  Andy Smith
  Wes Newton
  Tony Eccles
  Michael van Gerwen
  Roland Scholten
  Barrie Bates
  Andy Jenkins
  Alex Roy
  Paul Nicholson
  Matt Clark
  Adrian Gray
  Steve Maish
  Jacko Barry
  Jan van der Rassel
  Brendan Dolan
  Mick McGowan
  Dennis Smith
  John Magowan
  Colin Monk
  Steve Hine
  Peter Wright
  Steve Brown
  Mark Frost

Draw

2009 Grand Slam of Darts
Steve Maish was placed in Pool Three and draw in Group C along with 2009 Premier League runner up Mervyn King, 2009 BDO World Championship semi finalist Darryl Fitton and 2008 PDC World Championship runner up Kirk Shepherd. In his first Group C match, he was up against Darryl Fitton and comfortably won 5-1. In his next Group C match, he was up against Mervyn King and despite being the better player in terms of three dart average narrowly lost 5-4. In his last Group C match, he was up against Kirk Shepherd and lost 5-3 and was eliminated from the 2009 Grand Slam of Darts.

References

Grand Slam Wild Card Qualifier
Grand Slam Wild Card Qualifier
2009 Wild Car Qualifier